Basra-ye Bala (also Romanized as Başrā-ye Bālā; also known as Bālā Başrā and Başrā) is a village in Karipey Rural District, Lalehabad District, Babol County, Mazandaran Province, Iran. At the 2006 census, its population was 473, in 119 families.

References 

Populated places in Babol County